Aimee Bahng is an American academic. She is a professor of gender and women's studies at Pomona College in Claremont, California. Her previous denial of tenure at Dartmouth College sparked widespread protests about discrimination against racial minorities in academia.

Early life and education
Bahng received her bachelor's degree at Princeton University, then completed a master's degree at Middlebury College and a doctorate at the University of California, San Diego.

Career
Bahng taught at Dartmouth College. Her denial of tenure there sparked widespread protests about discrimination against racial minorities in academia.

In 2017, she was hired at Pomona College as an assistant professor in the gender and women's studies department.

Research
Bahng's research interests include Asian-American speculative fiction and the writer Octavia Butler.

Books

References

External links
Faculty page at Pomona College

Gender studies academics
Pomona College faculty
Dartmouth College faculty
University of California, San Diego alumni
American women of Asian descent
Princeton University alumni
Middlebury College alumni
American academics of Asian descent
Living people
Year of birth missing (living people)